Peter Paul Pillai was an Indian schoolmaster, landlord, politician and social reformer who represented Tirunelveli at the first session of the Indian National Congress.

Personal life
Peter Paul Pillai was a Roman Catholic schoolmaster and landowner. Peter Paul Pillai participated in the first session of the Indian National Congress.

Later life
Pillai qualified as a barrister-at-law in 1902. He led the 1885 inquiry into the condition of India and the 1891 forest law.

Notes

Year of birth missing
Year of death missing
Indian barristers
Indian National Congress politicians from Tamil Nadu
Indian Roman Catholics
Indian independence activists from Tamil Nadu
Indian social reformers
People from Tirunelveli district
20th-century Indian lawyers
Indian landlords